The False Olaf (died 1402) was a man who impersonated Olaf II of Denmark and Norway, who had actually died in 1387.

Prussian historian Johann von Posilge reported that in 1402 a poor sick man came to the country and stayed near the village of Graudenz (now Grudziądz). A group of merchants from Denmark asked him if he was not well known in Denmark, since he looked very much like the late King Olaf. The merchants left to find another who had seen the king and returned with him. When the newcomer saw the one they took for Olaf, he cried out, "My lord king!" Many people, especially in Norway, did not believe that Olaf had died. They thought that Margaret I of Denmark had poisoned young Olaf to get him out of the way so that she could rule. According to the rumors, young Olaf hid himself and escaped. The news reached a merchant, Tyme von der Nelow, who took the man to Danczik (now Gdańsk). The high born of the town welcomed Olaf as the rightful King of Denmark and Norway and gave him fine clothes and presents. A seal was made for him, and he wrote to Queen Margaret informing her that he was her son. He demanded the restoration of his lands and titles. Queen Margaret wrote back, saying that if he could prove himself her son, she would gladly accept him.

The Grand Master of the Teutonic Knights escorted the pretender to Kalmar to be interviewed by the queen. As soon as the man arrived he was discovered to be an impostor. He could speak not a single word of Danish and on questioning admitted he was a Prussian who was the son of peasants: Adolph and Margaret from Erlau (now Eger). The false Olaf was taken to Lund in Scania. There he admitted to his breach against the monarchy and was condemned to be burned at the stake. The letters he wrote to Queen Margaret were hung around his neck and a mock crown placed on his head before he was lowered into the flames. His possessions were given to a monastery, and the queen had the false Olaf's seal destroyed. The Danish Council of the Realm released a detailed explanation of the real Olaf's death in 1387 to contradict the story that had spread around the Baltic.

References

14th-century births
1402 deaths
15th-century German people
Impostor pretenders
People executed by Denmark by burning
Old Prussian people
Pretenders to the Danish throne
Pretenders to the Norwegian throne
People executed by the Kalmar Union
15th-century executions